Dakota Lil is a 1950 American Western film directed by Lesley Selander and written by Maurice Geraghty. The film stars George Montgomery, Rod Cameron, Marie Windsor, John Emery, Wallace Ford and Jack Lambert. The film was released on February 17, 1950, by 20th Century Fox.

Plot
Tom, a secret service agent on the hunt for gang of counterfeiters, gains the confidence of one of the gang's ringleaders.

Cast 
George Montgomery as Tom Horn / Steve Garrett
Rod Cameron as Harve Logan / Kid Curry
Marie Windsor as Dakota Lil
John Emery as Vincent
Wallace Ford as Carter
Jack Lambert as Dummy
Larry Johns as Sheriff
Marion Martin as Blonde Singer
James Flavin as Secret Service Chief
Walter Sande as Butch Cassidy
Lillian Bronson as Sheriff's Wife
Kenneth MacDonald as Fletch
Clancy Cooper as Bartender
Bill Perrott as Cashier
Alberto Morin as Rurales Captain 
J. Farrell MacDonald as Ellis
Anita Ellis as Dakota Lil's Singing Voice

Comic book adaptation
 Fawcett: Dakota Lil (1949)

References

External links 
 

1950 films
1950s English-language films
20th Century Fox films
American Western (genre) films
1950 Western (genre) films
Films directed by Lesley Selander
Films adapted into comics
American black-and-white films
1950s American films